
Gmina Izbica Kujawska is an urban-rural gmina (administrative district) in Włocławek County, Kuyavian-Pomeranian Voivodeship, in north-central Poland.

Villages
Apart from the town of Izbica Kujawska, Gmina Izbica Kujawska contains the villages and settlements of Augustynowo, Błenna, Błenna A, Błenna B, Chociszewo, Cieplinki, Ciepliny, Ciepliny-Budy, Długie, Gąsiorowo, Grochowiska, Helenowo, Józefowo, Kazanki, Kazimierowo, Komorowo, Mchówek, Mieczysławowo, Modzerowo, Naczachowo, Nowa Wieś, Obałki, Pasieka, Skarbanowo, Ślazewo, Śmielnik, Śmieły, Sokołowo, Świętosławice, Świszewy, Szczkówek, Tymień, Wietrzychowice, Wiszczelice, Wólka Komorowska and Zdzisławin.

Neighbouring gminas
Gmina Izbica Kujawska is bordered by the gminas of Babiak, Boniewo, Lubraniec, Przedecz and Topólka.

References
Polish official population figures 2006

Izbica Kujawska
Włocławek County